Sir John Duntze, 1st Baronet ( – 5 February 1795) was an English merchant, banker and politician who sat in the House of Commons from 1768 to 1795.

Duntze was the son of John Duntze merchant of Exeter and his wife Elizabeth Hawker, daughter of James Hawker or Hawkes of Luppitt, Devon. He was  clothier and general merchant at Exeter. He married Frances Lewis, daughter of Samuel Lewis in or before 1765. In 1776 he founded a bank in London with John Halliday and William Mackworth Praed.

Duntze served as Member of Parliament for Tiverton from 1768 until his death in 1795. He was created baronet in 1774.

References 

1735 births
1795 deaths
Baronets in the Baronetage of Great Britain
Members of the Parliament of Great Britain for English constituencies
British MPs 1774–1780
British MPs 1780–1784
British MPs 1784–1790
British MPs 1790–1796